The discography of American country singer-songwriter Hank Locklin contains 29 studio albums, 10 compilation albums, two box sets, 96 singles, two additionally-charting songs and one album appearance. He had his first hit with "The Same Sweet Girl" (1949) after signing with Four Star Records. The song reached the top ten of the Billboard country singles chart, peaking at number eight. A string of singles were released over the next several years that were not successful. With a leasing agreement administered by Decca Records, he had his next hit in 1953 with the number one song, "Let Me Be the One." Disappointed by label management, he switched to RCA Victor Records in 1955. Under the production of Chet Atkins, he had his biggest success. His next hit came with 1956's "Why Baby Why," which reached number nine on the country chart. Between 1957 and 1958, he had three top ten country hits: "Send Me the Pillow You Dream On," "Geisha Girl" and "It's a Little More Like Heaven." In 1958, he recorded among country music's first concept albums called Foreign Love. In 1960, Locklin released his biggest hit single, "Please Help Me, I'm Falling." Not only did it top the Billboard country singles chart, but it also reached number eight on the Billboard Hot 100 list. It was also one of several hits Locklin had in the United Kingdom, peaking at number nine on their pop chart.

Locklin had several more Billboard country hit singles in the early 1960s. This included "One Step Ahead of My Past," "Happy Birthday to Me" and "Happy Journey." He also released several more concept studio albums, beginning with a tribute album to Roy Acuff and an album of Irish recordings. His studio releases also began appearing on the Billboard Top Country Albums chart, beginning with The Girls Get Prettier in 1966. In 1968, he had his last top ten hit with "The Country Hall of Fame." As the decade progressed, his singles continued charting, yet went into lower-end song positions. In 1968 and 1969 he had his final top 40 singles on the country chart. His final album to peak on the country albums chart was 1969's Softly. He remained with RCA records until the early 1970s and released several more studio albums. This included a collaboration with Danny Davis on an album of brass instrumentation. In the latter part of the 70s, he recorded studio albums for two separate labels. In 2001, he released his first studio offering in many years titled Generations in Song. This was followed in 2006 by his final album, a collection of gospel tunes called By the Grace of God.

Albums

Studio albums

Compilation albums

Box sets

Singles

As lead artist

As a collaborative artist

Other charted songs

Other album appearances

Notes

References

External links
 Hank Cochran discography at Discogs

Country music discographies
Discographies of American artists